The Fryingpan–Arkansas Project, or "Fry-Ark," is a water diversion, storage and delivery project serving southeastern Colorado. The multi-purpose project was authorized in 1962 by President Kennedy to serve municipal, industrial, and hydroelectric power generation, and to enhance recreation, fish and wildlife interests. Construction began in 1964 and was completed in 1981. The project includes five dams and reservoirs, one federal hydroelectric power plant (two private, FERC regulated plants), and 22 tunnels and conduits totaling  in length. The Bureau of Reclamation, under the Department of the Interior built and manages the project.

Operation
The following year, 2012, snowpack was scarce and drought returned to the state.

Before the Fry-Ark Project could be built in its entirety, a compromise had to be struck between East and West Slope water politics. Ruedi provides water to Colorado's West Slope, in part to compensate for what is diverted further upstream.

Water is diverted from the West Slope's Fryingpan River basin. A series of interconnected tunnels carrying water from 16 small diversion dams, all at an elevation of above , collect snowmelt and run it, via gravity, to the Charles H. Boustead Tunnel. The Boustead conveys water underneath the Continental Divide  before discharging it into Turquoise Lake just west of Leadville.

The power plant takes its name from Mt. Elbert, Colorado's tallest peak, and sits at its base. The two-unit facility is the largest hydroelectric power plant in Colorado. During night time hours, when power rates are less expensive, the reversible pump-back units return water from Twin Lakes—water that was already used at least once by the units to generate electricity—back to the forebay so it can flow down again for more power generation. The Western Area Power Administration markets the power generated at the plant.

Water exiting the Mt. Elbert Power Plant helps fill Twin Lakes Reservoir, a natural lake bed that was enlarged and impounded by the Twin Lakes Dam during 1978–1980. The reservoir sits on Lake Creek which runs down from Independence Pass. Water from the reservoir continues down Lake Creek to the Arkansas River, which is the main delivery vehicle for the Fry-Ark project.

Pueblo Reservoir, the center piece of Lake Pueblo State Park, is the last reservoir in the project and sits on the Arkansas just west of Pueblo. The majority of municipal and agricultural deliveries for the project are made out of Pueblo Reservoir before the water continues on east to Kansas via the Arkansas.

References

External links

  Fryingpan-Arkansas Project 50th Anniversary Film, Bureau of Reclamation
 The Great Plains Region 
 The Eastern Colorado Area Office
Lake Pueblo Water Levels
Twin Lakes Water Levels
Turquoise Reservoir Water Levels
Ruedi Reservoir Water Levels

Energy infrastructure completed in 1981
Energy infrastructure in Colorado
Buildings and structures in Colorado
United States Bureau of Reclamation
Interbasin transfer
Hydroelectric power plants in Colorado